Paweł Żuk (born 29 January 2001) is a Polish professional footballer who plays as a right-back or a right midfielder for Lancaster City on loan from EFL League Two club Barrow.

Early life
Żuk was born in Gdańsk, before moving to England with his family at the age of four.

Club career

Early years
He started his early footballing years with Oldham Athletic before moving to Everton at the age of 14 for £400k. When he was 15 he received the award for the best footballer in the academy for the under-15's. In the 2018–19 season Żuk made 32 appearances and scored 2 goals for the under-18's team.

Lechia Gdańsk
In 2019, Żuk moved back to the city of his birth to play for Lechia Gdańsk, signing a three-year contract and being given the number 30 shirt. He made his Lechia Gdańsk II debut in the Tricity Derby, with Arka Gdynia winning the game 2–0. In September 2019, Żuk played all 90 minutes as Lechia II beat Stolem Gniewino 11–0. Żuk made his first senior appearance on 7 February 2020 coming on as a substitute against Śląsk Wrocław in a 2–2 draw. In total Żuk made only 2 appearances for Lechia during his first professional season, with the club deciding the player was surplus to requirements at that time and would be allowed to leave during the summer.

Wisła Płock
On 21 July 2020, he signed a two-year contract with Wisła Płock for a nominal fee. After starting Wisła's first three games of the season, Żuk found himself dropped to the substitutes bench, before being dropped from the matchday squad altogether. After only 5 months and 4 games with Wisła, he left the club by mutual consent on 11 December 2020.

Radomiak Radom & Ashton United
After 10 months without a club, and more than a year since his last game, Żuk was announced to have joined newly promoted Ekstraklasa team Radomiak Radom on trial, with the possibility of the player joining the reserve squad if the trial were to be successful. After not impressing during his trial, Żuk left Radomiak without being offered a contract. By January 2022 Żuk had returned to England and had started to train with English non-league club Ashton United. While the move saw Żuk training with the first team, there was no contract signed with the club and Żuk did not feature in any matchday squads, with the move most likely having been an agreement between the club and player so that Żuk could focus on his fitness while searching for another club.

Ruch Chorzów
On 26 January 2022, after spending two weeks on trial with Polish II liga side Ruch Chorzów, he signed a half-year contract with a one-year extension option with the club. At the end of the season, Żuk's contract was not extended, and he departed the club.

Barrow 
On 22 August 2022, Żuk returned to England, signing a one-year contract with League Two club Barrow.

On 4 November 2022, Źuk joined Northern Premier League Division One West club Glossop North End on an initial one-month loan deal. On 10 February 2023, he joined Lancaster City on a one-month loan deal.

International career

Żuk made his international debut for Poland U15 against the Republic of Ireland in a 2–1 away win. He made one more appearance for the under-15's, playing twice for the age group in total. Żuk also played for Poland U17, playing 11 times in total and scoring thrice. His first two goals came in the 8–0 win over San Marino. Żuk made his Poland U18 debut in an international friendly tournament held in La Manga, Spain. He played in all three of Poland's games as they finished 3rd in their group.

Career statistics 

 As of 26 December 2022

References

2001 births
Sportspeople from Gdańsk
Living people
Polish footballers
Poland youth international footballers
Association football defenders
Lechia Gdańsk players
Wisła Płock players
Ruch Chorzów players
Barrow A.F.C. players
Glossop North End A.F.C. players
Lancaster City F.C. players
Ekstraklasa players
II liga players
Northern Premier League players
Polish expatriate footballers
Expatriate footballers in England
Polish expatriate sportspeople in England